International Ballet Competition may refer to:

Genée International Ballet Competition, promoted by the Royal Academy of Dance, first held in 1931
California Dance Classics, first held in San Francisco, California USA in 2017
Helsinki International Ballet Competition, first held in 1989
International Ballet Competition Hellas, held in Athens, Greece since 2001
Japan International Ballet Competition, first held in 1993
Moscow International Ballet Competition, first held in 1969
New York International Ballet Competition, held from 1984 to 2009
Serge Lifar International Ballet Competition, first held in 1994 in Kiev and named after Serge Lifar
Shanghai International Ballet Competition, first held in 2004
South African International Ballet Competition, first held in 2008
World Ballet Competition, first held in 2007 in Orlando, Florida
USA International Ballet Competition, held in Jackson, Mississippi since 1979
Varna International Ballet Competition, held at the unique outdoor theatre in Varna, Bulgaria, since 1964
Rudolf Nureyev International Ballet Competition, held in Budapest, Hungary since 1994
Youth America Grand Prix, held in New York, USA, since 1999
Tallinn International Ballet Competition, held in Tallinn, Estonia, since 2014

See also 
Prix Benois de la Danse, international ballet competition held in Moscow, Russia
Prix de Lausanne, international ballet competition held in Lausanne, Switzerland

Ballet competitions